CBITor cbit may refer to:
 Continuous Built-in test
 CBIT (TV), a television rebroadcaster (channel 5) licensed to Sydney, Nova Scotia, Canada, rebroadcasting CBHT
 Chaitanya Bharathi Institute of Technology, an educational institution based in Gandipet, Hyderabad, India.
 classical bit. Used in quantum information theory to distinguish from qubit. 
 Community Broadcast Initiative Tyneside, the operator of Newcastle upon Tyne community radio station NE1fm, and previously other Restricted Service Licence broadcasts
 Comprehensive Behavioral Intervention for Tics, a form of behavioral therapy used in the treatment of tic disorders
 Cobalt-precorrin-7 (C15)-methyltransferase (decarboxylating), an enzyme